The title First Lady of the Nation began to be used in 1934, and its first holder was María Michelsen Lombana, a Colombian scientist, wife of President Alfonso López Pumarejo.1 From then on the title is applied to all married women with the president on duty, since the opposite case has never been presented, that is, there has never been a female president in this country.

Although the fact that these women used their husbands' surnames in their names fell into disuse, this tradition is preserved by protocol. Thus, for example, María Michelsen Lombana is renamed María Michelsen de López.

The current first lady is the wife of President Gustavo Petro, Verónica Alcocer.

Current living first ladies

List

First ladies (since 1819 until 1934)
In the following list, the wives of the Heads of State of Colombia from 1819 until 1934

First ladies (since 1934)

In the following list the all first ladies since 1934

See also

First Lady of Venezuela

Notes

References

External links

First ladies
Colombia
Lists of wives